64 Aurigae is a single star located 312 light years away from the Sun in the northern constellation of Auriga. It is visible to the naked eye as a dim, white-hued star with an apparent magnitude of 5.87. The star is moving closer to the Earth with a heliocentric radial velocity of −10, and may come to within  in around 5.3 million years. It is a member of the Sirius supercluster.

This object is an ordinary A-type main-sequence star with a stellar classification of 5 Vn, where the 'n' notation is used to indicate "nebulous" lines in the spectrum caused by rapid rotation. It is 291 million years old with a projected rotational velocity of 212 km/s. The star has 1.67 times the mass of the Sun and is radiating 27 times the Sun's luminosity from its photosphere at an effective temperature of 8,014 K.

References

A-type main-sequence stars
Auriga (constellation)
Durchmusterung objects
Aurigae, 64
056221
035341
2753